This is a list of North Melbourne Football Club premiership results since the club's inception in 1869.

VFA premierships

1 The Challenge Final was scratched and North Melbourne were awarded the premiership after Richmond objected to the umpire chosen for the match and refused to play.

Under 19 premierships

Note: Prior to the establishment of the U-19s comp in 1946, North Melbourne fielded a successful Colts side in a local fixture which was responsible for developing junior stars like Dally O'Brien, Les Foote, Don Condon, Kevin Dynon and Keith McKenzie

Reserve premierships

Night and pre-season premierships

VFL/AFL premierships

Champions of Australia

Note: The Champions of Australia series was discontinued after 1975. As a result, North Melbourne retains both the Winfield Cup as a permanent memento of the victory, and retains the perpetual Australia Cup.

References

Premiership results
Melbourne sport-related lists
Australian rules football-related lists